Chad Cabana (born October 1, 1974) is a Canadian former professional ice hockey player. He was selected by the Florida Panthers in the ninth round (213th overall) of the 1993 NHL Entry Draft.

Cabana played four seasons (1991 – 1995) of major junior hockey with the Tri-City Americans of the Western Hockey League, scoring 76 goals and 98 assists for 174 points, while earning 576 penalty minutes, in 260 games played.

He went on to play nine seasons of professional hockey, including 293 games played in the American Hockey League where, between 1995 and 2001, he racked up 75 points and 1,010 penalty minutes.

Cabana retired after the 2003-04 season, during which he skated in 10 contests for the Miami Manatees of the World Hockey Association 2.

Career statistics

References

External links

1974 births
Living people
Canadian ice hockey left wingers
Carolina Monarchs players
Colorado Gold Kings players
Florida Panthers draft picks
Fort Wayne Komets players
Ice hockey people from Alberta
Jacksonville Barracudas (ACHL) players
Louisville Panthers players
New Haven Knights players
People from the Municipal District of Bonnyville No. 87
Port Huron Border Cats players
Providence Bruins players
Tri-City Americans players